Dinu Ghezzo (1941 - December 10, 2011) was a Romanian conductor who was director of the Composition Studies at New York University.

References

NYU Faculty bio
INMC

Romanian conductors (music)
Male conductors (music)
1941 births
2011 deaths
20th-century conductors (music)
20th-century Romanian musicians
20th-century male musicians
21st-century conductors (music)
21st-century Romanian musicians
21st-century male musicians
New York University faculty